Covey usually refers to group of certain birds such as partridges or quails.

Covey may also refer to:

 Covey (surname)

See also
 FranklinCovey, provider of business education and training based on Stephen Covey's writings
 Smith's Ballpark, Utah baseball stadium formerly known as Franklin Covey Field
 20th Tactical Air Support Squadron used Covey as its call sign during the Vietnam War (Second Indochina War)